The flag of Kamchatka Oblast, in the Russian Federation, was a horizontal bicolour of white and blue charged with an emblem displaying three volcanic mountains on the upper left hoist. The emblem was a modification of the arms of Kamchatka with a white background. The arms, in contrast, display a blue background.

The flag was adopted in February, 2002. The proportions are 2:3. In 2007, Kamchatka Oblast ceased to exist and was merged with Koryak Autonomous Okrug to become a new federal unit called Kamchatka Krai. Thus, the flag was replaced by the Flag of Kamchatka Krai, which is visually similar.

References
Flags of the World

Flag
Flags of the federal subjects of Russia